Jess Kedwell Vanstrattan (born 19 July 1982) is a retired Australian professional footballer who played as a goalkeeper.

Vanstrattan was born in Gosford and started his senior career with Central Coast. He played the majority of his career in Italy before returning to Australia to play in the A-League for Gold Coast United, Central Coast Mariners and Newcastle Jets.

Early life
Vanstrattan was born in Gosford, New South Wales.

Playing career

Club
Vanstrattan started his career for Central Coast and then Northern Spirit in Sydney. At just 17 he made his 1st grade debut for the Spirit, playing the last 3 games of the season for the National Soccer League club.

Verona
In summer 2001, he was signed by Juventus on a 5-year deal and loaned to Verona in a co-ownership deal for 500 million lire. At Verona, aged 19, Vanstrattan was a regular on the bench for the Serie A side and played 54 games in 2 years for the reserve team (Campionato Nazionale Primavera).

In his third season, Verona assistant Marco Baroni, ex defender of the Scudetto winning Napoli side of Diego Maradona was signed as head coach of Carrarese Calcio and signed Vanstrattan (on loan) immediately in the 2003–04 season, where he made his first team debut in Italy. However, in the first game of that season Vanstrattan suffered a serious knee injury rupturing his right knee ACL and missed the remainder of the season.

In January 2004, his loan was ended and Vanstrattan returned to Verona where he signed a 4-year contract extension . In June 2004, the co-ownership deal was terminated and Verona received full registration rights.

Juventus
Vanstrattan was involved in a controversial transfer saga in the summer of 2007. After ending his contract with Verona by mutual agreement (due expire in 2008), Jess returned home to Australia in June, criticising Verona for several years of not fulfilling promises made. He signed for Juventus a month later. Vanstrattan played pre-season  games for the Old Lady, becoming the first Australian to turn out for the club. However, in early August 2007, the Lega Calcio ruled that the goalkeeper's contract at Juventus was illegal after Verona (as found in a court hearing) falsified documents including the falsification of Vanstrattan's signature in an attempt to block the transfer of the player to Juventus and the transfer was to be cancelled until courts could decide an outcome.

Vanstrattan needed to return to Verona officially under contract again, although only for four days, within which time the courts found Verona guilty. The club was ordered to agree on a loan deal which saw the player return to Juventus on 21 August, in time for the 2007–08 Serie A season.

Vanstrattan played for Juventus in China, Hong Kong and Australia in  friendly matches.

In June 2008, Vanstrattan did not agree to a three-year contract extension with Juventus and was released by both Verona and Juve.

Gold Coast United
On 7 October 2008, Vanstrattan became the first signing for Gold Coast United after being released by Juventus in June.

On 3 August 2009 he succumbed to an ankle injury sustained while training in preparation for the first game of the 2009–10 A-League season. He was sidelined for several weeks 
but recovered to play the rest of the season, and after a slow start was able to put in several man of the match performances.

Central Coast Mariners
On 19 July 2010, Vantstrattan was signed by the Central Coast Mariners after he wanted to move back home. Central Coast had recently lost first choice goal keeper Danny Vukovic to Turkish club Konyaspor. Unfortunately, 3 games after signing with the club, Vanstrattan suffered a second ACL rupture and missed the duration of the season.
On 14 April 2011 Vanstrattan was released by the Mariners.

International
Vanstrattan played a number of games for the Australia U-17 team in 1999. This included winning the OFC U-17 Championship and playing in the 1999 FIFA U-17 World Championship, where The Joeys finished second.

In 2001, Vanstrattan played in the Australia U-20 side which won the 2001 OFC U-20 Championship, and went on to participate in the 2001 FIFA World Youth Championship.

Vanstrattan went on to represent Australia U-23 in two friendlies against club sides in Germany.

Management career
In 2014, Vanstrattan became the goalkeeping coach for Central Coast Mariners Academy. The academy was eventually dissolved in 2014.
In 2015, Vanstrattan became the goalkeeping coach for Newcastle Jets

Career statistics

Honours

International
Australia national football team
OFC U-17 Championship: 1999
OFC U-20 Championship: 2001

See also
List of Central Coast Mariners FC players
List of Gold Coast United FC players
List of foreign Serie B players

References

External links
 Oz Football profile
 

Australian soccer players
Australian expatriate soccer players
Australia youth international soccer players
Australia under-20 international soccer players
Serie B players
National Soccer League (Australia) players
Hellas Verona F.C. players
Juventus F.C. players
A.C. Ancona players
A-League Men players
Central Coast Mariners FC players
Gold Coast United FC players
Newcastle Jets FC players
Melbourne City FC non-playing staff
Central Coast Mariners FC non-playing staff
Association football goalkeepers
Expatriate footballers in Italy
People from Gosford
Australian people of Dutch descent
1982 births
Living people
Association football goalkeeping coaches
Sportsmen from New South Wales
Soccer players from New South Wales